Into the Sun is the ninth studio album by Bassnectar, released on June 30, 2015.

Reception
The album debuted on Billboard 200 at No. 46, No. 1 on the Top Dance/Electronic Albums chart, selling 10,000 copies in its first week.  It has sold 41,000 copies as of June 2016.

Track listing
Track listing adopted from iTunes.

Notes
"Speakerbox" samples the hook from the Masia One song Warrior's Tongue, from the album Bootleg Culture (2012).
"Mixtape 13" is a continuous mix of all other songs from the album, though there are also a few other songs mixed in (such as an edit of San Holo’s “Double Oreo” and Stylust Beats' remix of Bassnectar’s song “Loco Ono”).

Charts

References

2015 albums
Bassnectar albums